Kazik Na Żywo ("Kazik Live", also known as KNŻ and Kaenżet) was a Polish rapcore band formed in 1991, in Warsaw.

History
Their first performance was during the music festival in Sopot, Poland, in 1992. Staszewski then shocked the audience, singing the song 100 000 000, which was based on Lech Wałęsa's presidential campaign unfulfilled promise that all Poles would be given 100 million złoty. In chorus, Staszewski repeats: Wałęsa, give me my 100 million, Wałęsa, give us our 100 million.

After the recording of Na żywo, ale w studio in 1994, Jabłoński was replaced by Tomasz Goehs. A few months later the guitarist Robert "Litza" Friedrich was added. After quitting the band, Robert Friedrich was replaced by Olaf Deriglasoff.

The band gave the last concert on 25 January 2004 in Gdańsk. Following a long break, the band announced its return. First concerts are scheduled for mid and late February 2009 in Toruń and Wrocław, with the lineup Staszewski (vocals), Burzyński (guitar), Kwiatkowski (bass guitar), Friedrich (guitar) and Goehs (drums).

Band members

Current members
Adam Burzyński - guitar
Robert Friedrich - guitar, vocal (1994–2000, 2009–2015)
Tomasz Goehs - drums, vocal (1994–2004, 2009–2015)
Michał Kwiatkowski - bass, guitar
Kazik Staszewski - vocal, guitar

Former members
Olaf Deriglasoff - guitar, sampler (2000–2004)
Kuba Jabłoński - drums (1992–1994)

Discography

Studio albums

Live albums

References

External links

Kazik Na Żywo Official Website (in Polish)

Nu metal musical groups
Polish hard rock musical groups
Polish alternative rock groups
Rapcore groups